Sormida is a genus of longhorn beetles of the subfamily Lamiinae.

 Sormida cinerea Dillon & Dillon, 1952
 Sormida maculicollis Thomson, 1865

References

Lamiinae